Rawlins Cross is a Celtic band that formed in 1988 in Atlantic Canada. With members from Newfoundland, Nova Scotia, Prince Edward Island and Ontario, the band took its name from an intersection in St. John's, Newfoundland.

Formation and early history
Rawlins Cross was formed in St. John's in the late 1980's by songwriting brothers Dave Panting (guitar and mandolin), Geoff Panting (keyboards and accordion) and Ian McKinnon (highland pipes and tin whistle). They then added drummer Pamela Paton and bassist Lorne Taylor to the band.

The band started in the East Coast recording scene in late 1989 with its first Indie recording, A Turn of the Wheel and a video for the single "Colleen." Weeks after its release, "Colleen" had a top ten radio slot on Toronto's CFNY station. In 1991, Lorne Taylor left the band, with Derek Pelley briefly replacing Taylor on bass. Prior to the recording of their sophomore album, Crossing The Border, Pamela Paton left in late 1991, to be replaced by Tom Roach. Bassist Derek Pelley left in early 1992, and was replaced by Brian Bourne.

Popularity and mainstream success
In 1992, the band released Crossing The Border, which further developed the fusion of highland bagpipes, mandolin and accordion with a rhythm section. A year later, after Rawlins Cross brought in drummer Howie Southwood, the band recorded Reel 'n' Roll, which would be its best-selling album and launch a national radio hit with the title track. Prior to the recording of Reel 'n' Roll, Prince Edward Island singer Joey Kitson joined the band as the new lead singer. Prior to Kitson joining the band, guitarist Dave Panting sang lead vocals for the band on the albums, A Turn of the Wheel and Crossing The Border.

Rawlins Cross released Living River in 1996, which garnered two Juno Award nominations. The band toured Canada three times that year and signed a licensing deal for its music in Europe.

Rawlins Cross performed live on the nationally televised East Coast Music Awards and performed at the ninth annual St. Patrick's Day Celebration Festival in Germany and also represented Canada at the Expo Cumbre de las Americas in Santiago, Chile.

Two more albums followed: Celtic Instrumentals in 1997, a retrospective collection, and the 1998 studio album Make It On Time, which would prove to be the band's last album for more than a decade.

Following a six-year hiatus, Rawlins Cross reunited in the fall of 2008 and released its seventh recording, Anthology. In November 2010, they released their eighth album, Heart Head Hands. Their next recording, Rock Steady, was recorded at Codapop Studios (in Halifax, Nova Scotia) and released in December 2017 with the single, "Hold You Tonight".

Style
Rawlins Cross mixed Scottish, Irish, Celtic, and Rock'n'Roll elements. Their style ranged from Celtic-instrumental to blues to folk, always with a strong rhythmic feeling, and combined contemporary song stylings with traditional instrumentation and story elements. The principal songwriters were brothers Dave and Geoff Panting.

After vocalist Joey Kitson joined the band in 1993, a number of the songs on the first two CDs, including "Turn Of the Wheel", "MacPherson's Lament", "Colleen" and "Open Road" were recorded again with Kitson singing lead, and released on subsequent recordings.

Band members
Joey Kitson — lead vocals, harmonica (1993–present)
Dave Panting — mandolin, guitar, banjo, harmonica, bouzouki, background vocals, songwriting (1988–present), lead vocals (1988-1993)
Geoff Panting — accordion, keyboard, background vocals, songwriting (1988–present)
Ian McKinnon — bagpipe, tin whistle, bodhran, trumpet, percussion, jaw harp (1988–present)
Brian Bourne — Chapman Stick, bass, background vocals (1992–present)
Howie Southwood — drums (1993–present)

Former band members
Pamela Paton — drums (1988-1991)
Lorne Taylor —bass (1988-1991)
Derek Pelley — bass (1991-1992)
Tom Roach — drums (1991-1993)

Discography

Albums

Singles

Awards and nominations
 1997 Juno Awards
 Nominations
 Best Roots/Traditional Album - Living River
 Best Album Design - Living River
 1999 East Coast Music Awards
 Winner
 Best Roots/Traditional
 Nominations
 Entertainer of the Year
 Best Group of the Year

References

External links
 Rawlins Cross Official Website

Musical groups established in 1988
Musical groups disestablished in 2001
Musical groups reestablished in 2008
Musical groups from St. John's, Newfoundland and Labrador
Canadian folk rock groups
Canadian Celtic music groups
Celtic rock groups
1988 establishments in Newfoundland and Labrador